The Jefatura de Inteligencia del Estado Mayor Conjunto de las Fuerzas Armadas (Intelligence Department of the Joint General Staff of the Armed Forces, J-2) is an Argentine federal agency in charge of controlling all the military intelligence services. The name J-2 refers to Jefatura 2, the official denomination assigned to military intelligence divisions of each branch.

See also

 Army Intelligence Service
 Naval Intelligence Service
 Air Force Intelligence Service
 National Intelligence System
 National Directorate of Strategic Military Intelligence
 US Army G-2

External links
  

Argentine intelligence agencies
Military of Argentina
Military intelligence agencies